The Discoverers is a 2012 American dark comedy directed and written by Justin Schwarz.  The film stars Griffin Dunne, Madeleine Martin, and Cara Buono.

Plot 
Washed-up history professor Lewis Birch (Oscar and Emmy nominated Griffin Dunne) takes his begrudging teenage kids – Zoe (Madeleine Martin, “Californication”) and Jack (Devon Graye, “American Horror Stories”) – on a road trip to a conference in hopes of putting his career back on track. But, when Lewis’s estranged father Stanley (Emmy Award-winning Stuart Margolin) goes AWOL on a Lewis and Clark historical reenactment trek, Lewis is forced to make a family detour. The Birch family find themselves on a journey of discovery and connection as they make their own passage west.

Cast 
 Griffin Dunne as Lewis Birch
 Madeleine Martin as Zoe
 Cara Buono as Nell
 John C. McGinley as Bill Birch
 Stuart Margolin as Stanley Birch
 Devon Graye as Jack
 Ann Dowd as Patti
 Dreama Walker as Abigail Marshall

Reception 
The film was a New York Times Critic's Pick. , the film holds an 88% approval rating on Rotten Tomatoes, based on 26 reviews with an average rating of 6.24 out of 10. The website's critics consensus reads: "The Discoverers is occasionally guilty of contrived silliness, but its humor and genuine warmth are more than enough to compensate for its modest shortcomings."

References

External links 
 
 
 discoverersmovie.com
 

2012 films
2012 black comedy films
Films shot in Oregon
Films set in Oregon
Films shot in Pennsylvania
Films shot in Chicago
2010s English-language films
American black comedy films
2010s American films